Lebanon is a NJ Transit railroad station on the Raritan Valley Line in Lebanon, New Jersey. There is a station building on the north side of the tracks. It was designed in 1899 by New York City architect Bradford Gilbert for the Central Railroad of New Jersey. The southern track is no longer in use and the stop has no weekend service. The station was purchased by the town in 1978.

Station layout
The station has a single low-level asphalt side platform.

References

External links

NJT Raritan Valley Line Information and Schedule

Lebanon, New Jersey
NJ Transit Rail Operations stations
Railway stations in the United States opened in 1852
Former Central Railroad of New Jersey stations
Railway stations in Hunterdon County, New Jersey
1852 establishments in New Jersey